The 57th Operations Group (57 OG) is the operational component of the 57th Wing, assigned to the United States Air Force's Air Combat Command. The group is stationed at Nellis Air Force Base, Nevada.

The Group provides direct oversight of the Nellis flying mission through the 57th Operations Support Squadron. They manage the airfield, operate the air traffic control tower, and the Nellis Air Traffic Control Facility providing radar service to local flying operations and the National Airspace System. It is responsible for scheduling, training, life support, weapons, tactics and planning staff functions. In addition to these functions, it also maintains administrative oversight of the 57th ATG staff and the 57th Wing staff.
The 57th OG also directs execution of two of the world's premier combat training exercises, Red Flag and Green Flag.

Units
 the 57th Operations Group is made up of the below units. Unless otherwise stated, the units are based at Nellis AFB, Nevada.

 6th Combat Training Squadron
 12th Combat Training Squadron (Fort Irwin, California)
 57th Information Aggressor Squadron
 57th Operations Support Squadron
 64th Aggressor Squadron (F-16 Fighting Falcon)
 65th Aggressor Squadron (F-35 Lightning II)
 414th Combat Training Squadron
 507th Air Defense Aggressor Squadron
 548th Combat Training Squadron (Green Flag East) (Fort Polk, Louisiana)
 549th Combat Training Squadron (Green Flag West)

History
See 57th Wing for associated lineage and timeline information.

World War II

The group was first activated as the 57th Pursuit Group in January 1941, flying P-40 Warhawks as part of the Army Air Corps Northeast Defense Sector (later assigned to the I Fighter Command) at Mitchel Field, New York. It trained in New England and provided air defense of the northeast after the Japanese attack on Pearl Harbor.  It was redesignated as the 57th Fighter Group (FG) in May 1942.

The 57th FG was reassigned to the U.S. Army Middle East Force in Egypt. In June 1942 the pilots and 72 new P-40Fs loaded aboard the aircraft carrier  at Quonset Point, Rhode Island, sailing 1 July. On 19 July, off the Gold Coast, they launched in four sections of 18 aircraft and flew to Accra, thence across Equatorial Africa to Palestine, officially becoming part of IX Fighter Command. However, prior to the group officially commencing operations, individual 57th FG pilots were attached to, and flew combat sorties with, P-40 squadrons of the Royal Air Force (RAF), South African Air Force (SAAF) and Royal Australian Air Force (RAAF), belonging to No. 211 Group, Desert Air Force.

In October 1942, the 57th FG officially began combat operations as a formation. The group took part in the Battle of El Alamein and, as part of Ninth Air Force, supported the Commonwealth Eighth Army's drive across Egypt and Libya, escorting bombers and flying strafing and dive-bombing missions against airfields, communications, and troop concentrations until Axis defeat in Tunisia in May 1943. The unit participated in the reduction of Pantelleria (May–June 1943) and the conquest of Sicily (July–August 1943). For front-line operations in direct support of the Eighth Army from the Battle of El Alamein to the capitulation of enemy forces in Sicily, the group received a Distinguished Unit Citation (DUC).

In an aerial battle over the Gulf of Tunis at Cape Bon in April 1943, the group destroyed approximately 74 of the enemy's transport and fighter aircraft while sending an equal number down to the sea and beaches to escape by crash landing. The 57th lost just six aircraft in this melee. Forever known by the 57th as the 18 April 1943 Goose Shoot – "The Palm Sunday Massacre," it received another DUC and it added four newly created aces. This action broke the German's aerial supply line and they surrendered Tunisia thirty days later.

The 57th supported the British Eighth Army's landing at Termoli and subsequent operations in Italy, being reassigned to Twelfth Air Force in August 1943. It flew dive-bombing, strafing, patrol, and escort missions.

Early in 1944, the group converted to P-47 Thunderbolt aircraft and flew interdiction operations in Italy. The group moved to Corsica on 30 March 1944 to operate as a separate task force. It flew interdiction missions against railroads, communication targets, and motor vehicles behind enemy lines, providing a minimum of 48 fighter-bomber sorties per day. During 9 days of combat operations during early April 1944, the 57th exceeded 50 sorties per day. While the group was stationed on Corsica, director William Wyler made a 45-minute long Technicolor documentary film, Thunderbolt!. filming combat missions of the 57th.  The film concentrated on Operation Strangle.  The film was released for the military in 1945 and for general release in 1947.

The group earned a third DUC c. 14 April 1944 for attacks in the Florence-Arezzo area. The group participated in the French campaign against Elba in June 1944 and in the invasion of Southern France in August. It engaged in interdiction and support operations in northern Italy from September 1944 to May 1945. For its operations in the Mediterranean Theater of Operations, the 57th earned the French Croix de Guerre with Palm (awarded in late 1967). It was inactivated on 13 April 1953.

The group remained in northern Italy after the end of the European War, demobilizing throughout the summer of 1945.  It was reassigned to the United States in August 1945 and was inactivated at the end of August.

Cold War

The group was reactivated in August 1946 and assigned to Alaskan Air Command as part of the air defense forces in the northwest Pacific. The group assumed the mission, personnel and equipment of the 343d Fighter Group, which was simultaneously inactivated at Shemya Army Air Base. It provided air defense initially in the Aleutian Islands, then moved in 1947 to Elmendorf Air Force Base. In 1948, as a result of the wing/base reorganization of the Air Force (Hobson Plan), the group became part of the 57th Fighter Wing, which included three support groups in addition to the group. In January 1950, it was redesignated as the 57th Fighter-Interceptor Group.  In January 1951, its parent 57th Fighter-Interceptor Wing inactivated, although the group remained active as part of the AAC air defense until 1 November 1952 when its personnel were reassigned and it became a paper unit. It was inactivated on 13 April 1953.

The group was reactivated at Paine Field, WA as the 57th Fighter Group (Air Defense) and assigned to Air Defense Command's Seattle Air Defense Sector, assuming the equipment and personnel of the 326th Fighter Group, which was simultaneously inactivated.  It was assigned the 64th Fighter-Interceptor Squadron, which was already at Paine with the 326th flying Convair F-102 Delta Daggers as its operational element and also several support units as it assumed USAF host unit duties at Paine. It provided air defense over the Pacific Northwest.  In June 1966, it briefly became non-operational when its 64th Squadron moved to Southeast Asia and was assigned away from the group.  However, after two weeks, the 498th Fighter-Interceptor Squadron, flying Convair F-106 Delta Darts, moved to Paine and became the group's new operational squadron.  It was inactivated 30 September 1968 when Air Defense Command closed its facilities at Paine AFB.

From 1991
On 1 November 1991, the group was redesignated the 57th Operations Group and activated as a result of the 57th Fighter Wing implementing the USAF objective wing organization. The 57 OG was assigned control of the wing's tactical units.

Upon activation, the 57th OG managed Air Force tactical training through Red Flag and Air Warrior exercises. Between July 1995 and March 2002, the group gained the three MQ-1 Predator reconnaissance squadrons. The Group deployed the Predator elements of the 11th and 15th Squadrons in support of operations in Bosnia (April 2000), Kuwait (October 2000), and Pakistan, September 2001 – January 2002 in support of Operation Enduring Freedom. The 57th Group's 66th Helicopter Squadron also deployed for operations in Northern Watch and Enduring Freedom. While at Nellis, the Group continued to provide air combat units for US and Allies with realistic, large force combat training at Red Flag.

From 1 July 2005 to 1 March 2018 the group was non-flying as the flying squadrons of the 57th were split off into the new 57th Adversary Tactics Group, which consolidated all Aggressor activities under one group to provide the Combat Air Forces with the opportunity to train against a realistic, fully integrated threat array during large- and small-scale exercises such as Red Flag – Nellis, Red Flag – Alaska, Maple Flag, Green Flag and dissimilar air combat training deployments.

On 2 March 2017 the group activated the 24th Tactical Air Support Squadron and once again is flying the F-16.

On 31 March 2020, the 57th Adversary Tactics Group merged back into the 57th Operations Group, bringing the 64th Aggressor Squadron and its F-16s with it.

Lineage
 Constituted as the 57th Pursuit Group (Interceptor) on 20 November 1940
 Activated on 15 January 1941
 Redesignated as 57th Fighter Group (Single Engine) on 15 May 1942
 Inactivated on 7 November 1945
 Activated on 15 August 1946
 Redesignated as 57th Fighter-Interceptor Group on 20 January 1950
 Inactivated on 13 April 1953
 Redesignated as 57th Fighter Group (Air Defense) and activated on 24 February 1961 (not organized)
 Organized on 1 April 1961
 Discontinued and inactivated on 30 September 1968
 Redesignated as 57th Fighter Weapons Group on 31 July 1985 (remained inactive)
 Redesignated as 57th Operations Group on 1 November 1991 and activated

Assignments

 7th Pursuit Wing, 15 January 1941
 I Interceptor Command (later I Fighter Command, 1 September 1941
 IX Fighter Command, c. 16 July 1942
 U.S. Army Middle East Force, July 1942
 Attached to Desert Air Task Force, 22 October 1942
 IX Fighter Command, 12 November 1942
 Attached to: Western Desert Air Force, 21 February 1943
 Attached to: Desert Air Force, c. April 1943
 Attached to: 7 South African Air Force No. 7 (South African) Wing?, 21 May 1943
 Attached to: XII Air Support Command, 22 August 1943
 Twelfth Air Force, 30 August 1943
 XII Air Support Command, 1 September 1943
 57th Bombardment Wing, 1 November 1943
 Unknown (probably XII Air Support Command), 2 January – 4 March 1944
 Attached to 64th Fighter Wing, 2 March 1944
 XII Air Support Command (later XXII Tactical Air Command), 5 March 1944
 Remained attached to 64th Fighter Wing] until 28 March 1944

 87th Fighter Wing, 23 April 1944
 XII Tactical Air Command, 10 September 1944
 XII Fighter (later, XII Tactical Air) Command, 15 September 1944
 Twelfth Air Force, 7 June – 7 August 1945
 Unknown, 8–22 August 1945
 Third Air Force, 23 August – 7 November 1945
 Alaskan Air Command, 15 August 1946
 Attached to Yukon Sector, Alaskan Air Command, 16–21 April 1947
 Headquarters, Fort Richardson, Alaska (later 57th Fighter Wing, Provisional), 20 November 1947 – 19 April 1948)
 57th Fighter Wing, 20 April 1948
 Attached to 10th Air Division [Defense], 10 December 1950
 Alaskan Air Command, 1 January 1951
 Remained attached to 10th Air Division [Defense] until 1 March 1951
 10th Air Division (Defense), 1 November 1952 – 13 April 1953
 Air Defense Command, 24 February 1961
 Seattle Air Defense Sector, 1 April 1961 – 30 September 1968
 57th Fighter Wing, 1 November 1991–present

Components

Operational Squadrons
 11th Reconnaissance Squadron: 29 July 1995 – 1 May 2007
 12th Combat Training Squadron: ? - present
 15th Reconnaissance Squadron: 1 August 1997 – 1 May 2007
 17th Reconnaissance Squadron: 8 March 2002 – 1 May 2007
 24th Tactical Air Support Squadron: 2 March 2018 – 23 December 2020
 58th Rescue Squadron: 14 June 2002 – 1 October 2003
 64th Fighter (later 64th Fighter-Interceptor, 64th Aggressor) Squadron: 15 January 1941 – 7 November 1945; 15 August 1946 – 13 April 1953; 1 April 1961 – 10 June 1966; 3 October 2003 – 15 September 2005; 31 March 2020 - present
 65th Fighter (later, 65th Fighter-Interceptor, 65th Aggressor) Squadron: 15 January 1941 – 7 November 1945; 15 August 1946 – 13 April 1953; 9 June 2022 - present
 66th Fighter (later 66th Fighter-Interceptor) Squadron: 15 January 1941 – 7 November 1945; 15 August 1946 – 13 April 1953

 57th USAF Dispensary: 1 April 1961 – 30 September 1968
 57th Air Base Squadron (later 57th Combat Support Squadron): 1 April 1961 – 30 September 1968
 57th Consolidated Aircraft Maintenance Squadron: 1 April 1961 – 30 September 1968
 57th Materiel Squadron: 1 April 1961 – 1 August 1964
 57th Operations Support Squadron: 1 November 1991 – present
 57th Supply Squadron 1 August 1964 – 30 September 1968
 66th Rescue Squadron: 1 February 1993 – 1 October 2003
 414th Combat Training Squadron: 4 October 2007 – present
 498th Fighter-Interceptor Squadron: 25 June 1966 – 30 September 1968
 547th Intelligence Squadron, 1 November 1991 – 15 September 2005
 548th Combat Training Squadron: 4 October 2007 – present
 549th Combat Training Squadron: 4 October 2007 – present
 561st Fighter Squadron: 1 February 1993 – 1 October 1996.

Stations

 Mitchel Field, New York, 15 January 1941
 Bradley Field, Connecticut], 19 August 1941
 Boston Airport, Massachusetts, 8 December 1941-c. 1 July 1942
 Fort Dix Army Air Field, New Jersey, 5 July 1942
 New York Port of Embarkation, New York, 15–16 July 1942
 Muqeible Airfield, British Mandate of Palestine, c. 20 July 1942
 Landing Ground 174, Egypt, 16 September 1942
 RAF El Daba, Egypt, 5 November 1942
 Sidi Haneish Airfield, Egypt, 8 November 1942
 Sidi Azeiz Airfield, Libya, 12 November 1942
 RAF Gambut, Libya, 13 November 1942
 Martuba Airfield, Libya, 16 November 1942
 Belandah Airfield, Libya, 3 December 1942
 Hamraiet Airfield, Libya, 3 January 1943
 Darragh Airfield, Libya, 19 January 1943
 Ben Gardane Airfield, Tunisia, 9 March 1943
 Soltane Airfield, Tunisia, 21 March 1943
 Hazbub Airfield, Tunisia, 4 April 1943
 Chekira Airfield, Tunisia, 10 April 1943
 El Djem Airfield, Tunisia, 14 April 1943
 Hani Airfield, Tunisia, 21 April 1943
 Bou Grara Airfield, Tunisia, May 1943
 Malta, 27 June 1943

 Pachino Airfield, Sicily, 19 July 1943
 Scordia Airfield, Sicily, August 1943
 Milazzo Airfield, Sicily, 12 September 1943
 Messina Airfield, Sicily, 15 September 1943
 Reggio Airfield, Italy, 16 September 1943
 Rocca Bernardo Airfield, Italy, 17 September 1943
 Gioia del Colle Air Base, Italy, c. 25 September 1943
 Foggia Airfield, Italy, 30 September 1943
 Amendola Airfield, Italy, c. 27 October 1943
 Cercola Airfield, Italy, 1 March 1944
 Alto Airfield, Corsica, 30 March 1944
 Ombrene Airfield, Italy, 9 September 1944
 Grosseto Airfield, Italy, 24 September 1944
 Villafranca di Verona Airfield, Italy, 29 April 1945
 Grosseto Airfield, Italy, 7 May 1945
 Bagnoli Airfield, Italy, 15 July 1945
 Naples Capodichino Airport, Italy, 5–6 August 1945
 Camp Miles Standish, Massachusetts, 18 August 1945
 Drew Field, Florida, 23 August – 7 November 1945
 Shemya Army Air Base, Aleutian Islands, Alaska, 15 August 1946
 Elmendorf Field, Alaska, 25 March 1947 – 13 April 1953
 Paine Field, Washington, 1 April 1961 – 30 September 1968
 Nellis Air Force Base, Nevada, 1 November 1991 – present

Aircraft assigned

 Curtiss P-40 Warhawk, 1941–1944
 Republic P-47 Thunderbolt, 1944–1945
 Lockheed P-38 Lightning, 1946
 North American P-51 Mustang, 1946–1948
 Lockheed F-80 Shooting Star, 1948–1951
 Lockheed F-94 Starfire, 1951–1952
 Convair F-102 Delta Dagger, 1961–1966

 Convair F-106 Delta Dart, 1966–1968
 McDonnell F-4 Phantom II, 1993–1996
 Sikorsky HH-60 Pave Hawk, 1993–2003
 General Atomics MQ-1 Predator, 1995–2005
 General Dynamics F-16 Fighting Falcon, 2003–2005, 2018–present
 Lockheed Martin F-35 Lightning II, 2022–present

Awards

 Distinguished Unit Citation
 North Africa and Sicily, 24 October 1942 – 17 August 1943
 Tunis and Cape Bon Area, 18 April 1943
 Italy, 14 April 1944

 Air Force Outstanding Unit Award
 1 January 1995 – 31 May 1997
 1 June 1998 – 31 May 2000
 1 June 2001 – 31 May 2003
 1 June 2003 – 31 May 2004
 1 June 2004 – 31 May 2006

 French Croix de Guerre with Palm, October 1942 – May 1945

 European-African-Middle Eastern Theater
 Campaigns
 Air Combat, EAME Theater
 Egypt-Libya
 Tunisia
 Sicily
 Naples-Anzio
 Rome-Arno
 Southern France
 Northern Apennines
 Po Valley

See also
Aerospace Defense Command Fighter Squadrons
SS Sea Owl

References

Footnotes

Citations

Bibliography

 
 
 \

External links
Nellis AFB Home Page
57th Wing
Official website of the 57th Fighter Group
57th Fighter Group
57th Fighter Group Exhibit at the New England Air Museum
 

057
Military units and formations in Nevada